Little Quirks are an Australian indie folk band formed on the Central Coast (New South Wales) in 2015 by sisters, Abbey Toole (guitar, vocals) and Mia Toole (drums, vocals), and their cousin Jaymi Toole (mandolin, vocals). The group have toured Australia and released four extended plays. In 2019 they were joined by Alex Toole (Jaymi's older brother) on bass guitar and since late 2021 Jordan Rouse provided electric guitar.

History 

Little Quirks were formed in 2015 in Gosford on the Central Coast, New South Wales by Abbey Toole (15 years-old) on guitar and lead vocals, her sister Mia Toole (11 years-old) on drums and vocals, and their cousin, Jaymi Toole (17 years-old) on mandolin and vocals. They started busking at food markets by playing cover versions of tracks by the Cranberries, Of Monsters and Men, and Vance Joy. The band were named by one of their parents, Abbey recalled, "We have always been very quirky kids and have our own little ways we do things." The band members' fathers had performed together in groups including Adam's Apple and in Sugarmoth.

Little Quirks issued their first extended play, Where We Hide, in 2016. It was produced by Abbey and Mia's father Adam Toole. Their early influences were The Lumineers and Mumford and Sons. The trio toured in support of Jack River, Xavier Rudd and Alex the Astronaut. Their second EP, Suzie Knows, appeared in 2017. In November of the following year they toured Western Australia. In 2019 their track, "Cover My Eyes", co-written by the trio, was a semi-finalist in two categories at the International Songwriting Competition: Americana and Folk, Singer-Songwriter. The group performed at the National Folk Festival in Easter 2019 in Canberra. Abbey described their music, "Folk is for all ages. It's one of the rawest and most real styles of music, where you can hear very personal stories you can relate to in songs. There's just something different about folk that we know other young people will love if they give it a chance."

Jaymi's older brother, Alex Toole (24 years-old), joined on bass guitar during 2019. He is also a secondary school music teacher. In January 2020 they issued another EP, Cover My Eyes, and started their tour of east coast venues. The EP was produced at Hercules Studios by Wayne Connolly for Ditto Music. Women in Pops Jess Richards felt, "[it] is a beguiling collection of five alt-folk tracks." Rod Yates of The Sydney Morning Herald observed, "Underneath the pastoral harmonies, lilting alt-folk and spirited singalongs lie some dark lyrical themes, particularly in the title track and its musings on mental health."

Due to COVID-19 restrictions they had been unable to tour for 18 months. They issued another single, "Florence's Town", in September 2020 via ABC Music. Unable to travel to the United Kingdom, they live-streamed the single launch of "Florence's Town", together with other tracks, from Damien Gerard Studios, Gosford in October. The live-stream included video collaborations with the Once and with Winterbourne. In December Little Quirks were signed to Downtown Music Publishing.

In December 2021 the line-up of Abbey, Jaymi and Mia started their The Rain Is Coming Tour, periodically including Alex. By that time their friend, Jordan Rouse had joined to provide electric guitar at some performances. In January 2022, due to another COVID-19 outbreak, they postponed their show in Dubbo to April. The band appeared at South by Southwest, Texas in March.

They released a single, "The Rain", in March 2022. NMEs Australian reviewer, Ellie Robinson, described it as "powerful" displaying an "emotive, ballad-esque run driven by coolly strummed acoustic guitars and bright piano chords." Its music video was directed by Tim Swallow. The group delivered their fourth EP, Call to Unknowns, in August 2022. Its six tracks includes the previous three singles, "Someone to Hold", "Florence's Town" and "The Rain". The EP was recorded and produced by Adam Toole at Grove Studios and at his home studio.

Members 

 Abbey Toole – guitar, vocals 
 Jaymi Toole – mandolin, vocals 
 Mia Toole – drums, vocals 
 Alex Toole – bass guitar 
 Jordan Rouse – electric guitar

Discography

Extended plays 

 Where We Hide (2016)
 Suzie Knows (2017)
 Cover My Eyes (January 2020)
 Call to Unknowns (August 2022)

Singles 

 "Crumbled" (2018)
 "I Told You So" (2018)
 "Life Wouldn't Be" (2019)
 "Someone to Hold" (2020)
 "Florence's Town" (2020)
 "The Rain" (2022)

References

External links 

 
 "Little Quirks – Singles & EPs" at iTunes store

Australian indie folk groups
Musical groups established in 2015
New South Wales musical groups
2015 establishments in Australia